Erkki Matti Toivanen (18 May 1938 – 21 July 2011) was a Finnish journalist and presenter for Yleisradio.

Career 

After gaining a master's degree in political history from the University of Helsinki in 1962, Toivanen joined the Finnish section of BBC World Service. One of his tasks there was to produce the music to the radio dramas written by Anselm Hollo and Matti Rossi.

In 1968 he was promoted to newsreader on television and radio, and from 1969 until 1972 he worked as the foreign news editor; in the same year he joined Yle as a news correspondent and broadcaster. His broadcasting career included commentating on four Eurovision Song Contest (1977–1978, 1982 & 1987) and hosting the Finnish coverage of the Summer Olympics on eight occasions between 1972 and 2000. From 1987 until 1994 he worked as a Yle TV1 news reporter, and from 1995 until 2000 as a special correspondent. He retired from Yle in 2001.

Personal life 

Toivanen was openly gay. He was married to a woman between 1963 and 1966. The marriage gave birth to a daughter in 1964. Since 1972, he was with long-time partner Lennox Walker, former manager of the T. Rex-band.

Toivanen received a stroke on July 14, 2010 and a new one three weeks later. In October of that year, he was diagnosed with a small tumor in his brain, which was cut in December 2010. Despite his treatments, he died on 21 July 2011 in London while sleeping. In accordance with his will his ash was scattered over the Blanchisseuse Beach of Walker's Trinidadian home, just like Toivanen himself had fulfilled the will of his Estonian-born mother in Narva-Jõesuu. Toivanen was fluent in Finnish, English, Estonian, German, Russian and French.

References

External links 

 Humanism evenings, Erkki Toivanen: Healthy roots of a real prerequisite for internationalization 
 Erkki Toivanen's obituary in Helsingin Sanomat  

1938 births
2011 deaths
People from Kuopio
Finnish broadcasters
Finnish television presenters
Finnish journalists
BBC people
Finnish people of Estonian descent
Finnish expatriates in the United Kingdom
Finnish television journalists
Finnish LGBT journalists
Finnish LGBT entertainers
Finnish LGBT broadcasters